The men's 50 metre breaststroke event in swimming at the 2013 World Aquatics Championships took place on 30–31 July at the Palau Sant Jordi in Barcelona, Spain.

Records
Prior to this competition, the existing world and championship records were:

Results

Heats
The heats were held at 10:00.

Semifinals
The semifinals were held at 18:18.

Semifinal 1

Semifinal 2

Final
The final was held at 18:41.

References

External links
Barcelona 2013 Swimming Coverage

Breaststroke 0050 metre, men's
World Aquatics Championships